Let;s Try the After, Vol. 1 is an EP by Canadian indie rock band Broken Social Scene. It was released on February 15, 2019 through Arts & Crafts Records.

Track listing

Charts

References

2019 EPs
Broken Social Scene albums
Arts & Crafts Productions EPs